Gustavo Henrique Vernes (born March 24, 1993), better known as Gustavo Henrique, is a Brazilian footballer who plays as a centre-back for Süper Lig club Fenerbahçe, on loan from Flamengo

Club career

Early career
Born in São Paulo, Gustavo Henrique moved to Salvador, Bahia at early age. He started his career at Vitória's youth setup, before moving back to his home state in 2007, after joining Santos.

Santos

Gustavo Henrique and made his first team – and Série A – debut on 17 June 2012, in a 0–1 away loss against Flamengo. He scored his first goal on 24 July of the following year, in a 2–0 away win against CRAC for the season's Copa do Brasil.

In mid-September 2013, Gustavo Henrique replaced Durval in the starting eleven, after the latter was deemed surplus to requirements. He scored his first league goal on 27 October, in a 1–1 away draw against Corinthians. Roughly a month later he scored his second, in a 2–2 away draw against Vasco da Gama.

In late February 2014, Gustavo Henrique suffered a knee injury, being sidelined for six months. He returned to action in October, but was only selected on the bench in the remainder of the season.

Gustavo Henrique played his first match after his injury on 1 February 2015, starting in a 3–0 home win against Ituano. In August, after the arrival of new manager Dorival Júnior, he was again first-choice after overtaking new signing Werley.

On 29 February 2016, Gustavo Henrique renewed his contract until January 2020. He became an undisputed starter during the campaign, and on 12 June completed his 100th game for the club by starting in a 2–0 away win against Santa Cruz. In September, however, he suffered another knee injury, being sidelined for another six months.

Gustavo Henrique returned to action on 14 August 2017, starting in a 0–0 home draw against Fluminense. On 10 September, in a 2–0 home win against Corinthians, he suffered another knee injury and was sidelined for the remainder of the year.

Gustavo Henrique made his Copa Libertadores debut on 5 April 2018, replacing Renato late into a 1–0 away win against Estudiantes.

Flamengo
In December 2019, Gustavo Henrique agreed to a pre-contract deal with Flamengo, effective as of the following 1 February. On 3 January 2020, however, he was announced by the club after agreeing to a four-year deal.

Fenerbahçe 
On 26 July 2022, Gustavo Henrique signed with Turkish club Fenerbahçe on a season-long loan with option to buy.

Career statistics

Honours

Club
Santos
Campeonato Paulista: 2015, 2016

Flamengo
Campeonato Brasileiro Série A: 2020
Recopa Sudamericana: 2020
Supercopa do Brasil: 2020, 2021
Campeonato Carioca: 2020, 2021

International
Brazil U23
 Pan American Bronze Medal: 2015

Individual
Campeonato Paulista Team of the Year: 2016, 2019

References

External links
Santos FC profile 

1993 births
Living people
Footballers from São Paulo
Brazilian footballers
Association football defenders
Campeonato Brasileiro Série A players
Süper Lig players
Santos FC players
CR Flamengo footballers
Fenerbahçe S.K. footballers
Brazil under-20 international footballers
Footballers at the 2015 Pan American Games
Pan American Games bronze medalists for Brazil
Pan American Games medalists in football
Medalists at the 2015 Pan American Games
Brazilian expatriate footballers
Brazilian expatriate sportspeople in Turkey
Expatriate footballers in Turkey